Pawar (also spelled as Pavar and Puar) is an Indian surname found among Koli, Maratha or Mahar castes in Maharashtra. Maratha Pawar  claim descent from the Parmar  clan of Rajput's.  Pawar is also a clan among the Maratha & Chhetri  clan of Nepal.

People with the surname (Paur/Pawar) include:

 Ajit Pawar (born 1959), Indian politician; deputy chief minister of Maharashtra and nephew of Sharad Pawar
 Ameya Pawar (born 1980), American politician and City of Chicago Alderman
 Anand Pawar, Indian badminton player
 Anjali Pawar, Indian social worker
 Bharati Pawar, Indian politician
 Dagdu Maruti Pawar, Indian Dalit author
 Hemendra Singh Rao Pawar, present Maharaja of Dhar State
 Krishnaji Rao III Puar, Maharaja of Dewas Senior and Indian politician
 Kuldeep Pawar, One of most popular Indian actor in the Marathi-language film industry
 Lalita Pawar (1916-1998), Popular Hindi TV & Marathi actress
 Narayan Rao Pawar (1925-2010), Indian independence activist and member of Arya Samaj who plotted to kill the last Nizam of Hyderabad
 Rajendra Singh Pawar, Indian businessman,  chairman of NIIT
 Rajesh Pawar (born 1979), Indian cricketer
 Sharad Pawar (born 1940), Indian politician
 Tukoji Rao IV Puar, Maharaja of Dewas Senior and Indian politician from Madhya Pradesh, belonging to the Bharatiya Janata Party
 Tukoji Rao III Puar, Maharaja of Dewas Senior
 Urmila Pawar (born 1945), Indian Marathi-language writer
 Uttamsingh Pawar, Indian politician
 Vikram Singh Rao II Puar, present Maharaja of Dewas Senior

References 

Indian surnames
Koli people
Koli clans